The Field Elm cultivar Ulmus minor 'Biltii' was selected by Bernard Groenewegen at his nursery in de Bilt, Netherlands, possibly from French seedlings, and identified in his catalogue of 1921–22 as U. campestris Biltii.

Description
'Biltii' has a compact, pyramidal crown, not unlike the Cornish Elm, with crowded, dark green and nearly round leaves. The tips of the younger shoots are tinged purplish-bronze, contrasting with the yellowish-green emergent leaves.

Cultivation
No specimens are known to survive.

Synonymy
Ulmus campestris 'Biltil': Pierre Lombarts' Royal Nurseries (Zundert, Netherlands) catalogue of 1959-60, p. 83. Misspelling.

References

External links
  Sheet labelled "U. carpinifolia hiltii"

Field elm cultivar
Ulmus articles missing images
Ulmus
Missing elm cultivars